The county of Devon is divided into ten districts. The districts of Devon are Exeter, East Devon, Mid Devon, North Devon, Torridge, West Devon, South Hams, Teignbridge and the unitary authorities Plymouth and Torbay.

As there are 427 Grade I listed buildings in the county they have been split into separate lists for each district.

 Grade I listed buildings in East Devon
 Grade I listed buildings in Exeter
 Grade I listed buildings in Mid Devon
 Grade I listed buildings in North Devon
 Grade I listed buildings in Plymouth
 Grade I listed buildings in South Hams
 Grade I listed buildings in Teignbridge
 Grade I listed buildings in Torbay
 Grade I listed buildings in Torridge
 Grade I listed buildings in West Devon

See also
 Grade II* listed buildings in Devon

 
Lists of listed buildings in Devon